Cambodia Adventist School – Kantrok is a K-9 co-educational Christian school located in Siem Reap, Cambodia. Unlike Cambodia Adventist School located in Phnom Penh, it is registered as a Cambodia Adventist Mission rural school but is operated by "Salt Ministries".

The school is operated and funded by SALT Ministries. The school charges a nominal fee of US$5–20 per student per year, but many families are too poor to pay this. The staff at the school are all volunteers receiving $45 for singles and $65 for families per month.

History
Cambodia Adventist School – Kantrok began in 1999 as a literacy school for poor children. When the school first opened in 1999, classes were held on a veranda. Later the students received desks to sit on. The first permanent school building was constructed in 2002, with five classrooms. The school plans to add high school classes in English for the 2005/6 school year, offering grade 7. Each year an additional grade will be added.

In the year 2004, the school was officially recognised by the Cambodian government as a primary school. Having a Seventh-day Adventist school is important as government schools teach students on Saturdays, which conflicts beliefs of the Seventh-day Adventist Church, and many schools will not allow children to have Saturdays off.

Academics
As of October 2004, the Cambodia Adventist School – Kantrok, has 130 students studying in grades K-6. Because the school has outgrown its facilities, the kindergarten class convenes on a veranda at the lay training housing facility, and the Grade 6 class use the Sala Chann (church hall). The student body is about 30% village children and 70% Wat Preah Yesu children. The children follow the Cambodian government curriculum taught in Khmer for 3 hours, and an English curriculum for 3 hours each day. They also receive Bible teachings as a subject. The school plans to add computer and manual arts to the curriculum.

See also 

 Wat Preah Yesu
 Cambodia Adventist School
 Seventh-day Adventist education
 List of Seventh-day Adventist secondary and elementary schools

References 

Schools in Cambodia
Seventh-day Adventist education